Agliano Terme is a comune (municipality) in the Province of Asti in the Italian region Piedmont, located about  southeast of Turin and about  southeast of Asti.

Agliano Terme borders the following municipalities: Calosso, Castelnuovo Calcea, Costigliole d'Asti, Moasca, and Montegrosso d'Asti. Traditionally called simply Agliano (or Ajan in Piemontese), the "Terme" was added in recent times to draw attention to the presence of thermal baths, a tourist attraction.

References

External links
 Official website

Cities and towns in Piedmont
Spa towns in Italy
Articles which contain graphical timelines